Nick & Knight is an eponymous collaborative album by American singer-songwriters Nick Carter and Jordan Knight, under the collective stage name of Nick & Knight. The album was released on September 2, 2014. A promotional song, "Just The Two of Us", is available for download with a pre-order of the album. The album's lead single, "One More Time", was released alongside a music video on July 15, 2014. Carter and Knight's respective bands, the Backstreet Boys and New Kids on the Block, have previously collaborated on an album entitled NKOTBSB, and also went out on a joint tour between 2011 and 2012 as supergroup NKOTBSB.

Background
In 2011 and 2012 Nick Carter and Jordan Knight performed with their respective bands, Backstreet Boys and New Kids on the Block as part of the NKOTBSB Tour. During the tour the idea of a collaboration between the two artists came up. Carter said how they explored the idea and eventually it turned into an entire album. According to Knight being part of a group "puts a lot of pressure on the creative process", while the collaboration gave them "a little more freedom to just explore and do something different than what would be expected."

Reception

Jennifer Gerson of The Guardian said of the album; "Nick & Knight showcase amazing, refreshing, fun take on a certain kind of masculinity, and thus the whole boyband genre".

Singles
 "One More Time" was released as the album's lead single on July 15, 2014.

Track listing

Notes
 signifies a vocal producer

Commercial performance
The album was released exclusively in the U.S. and Canada on September 2, 2014 where it debuted at No. 24 in the U.S. with 9,107 copies sold in its first week. In Canada, it debuted at No. 14 on the Canadian Albums Chart.

Charts

Weekly charts

Release history

Tour

References

2014 albums
Nick Carter (musician) albums
Jordan Knight albums
Collaborative albums
Albums produced by Louis Biancaniello